= Namahuni =

- Location in Iran
- Coordinates: 37°51′09″N 48°32′48″E
- Country: Iran
- Province: Ardabil Province
- Time zone: UTC+3:30 (IRST)
  - Summer (DST): UTC+4:30 (IRDT)

Namahuni is a village in the Ardabil Province of Iran.
